Taciszów  (de:Tatischau) is a village in the administrative district of Gmina Rudziniec, within Gliwice County, Silesian Voivodeship, in southern Poland.

The village has a population of 528.

References

Villages in Gliwice County